Viktor Horváth (born 26 February 1978, Székesfehérvár) is a modern pentathlete from Hungary. He competed at the 2008 Summer Olympics in Beijing, where he finished nineteenth in the men's event, with a score of 5,272 points.

Horváth also won individual gold medals at the 2007 European Senior Championships in Riga, Latvia, and at the 2007 World Modern Pentathlon Championships in Berlin, Germany.

References

External links
 

1978 births
Living people
Hungarian male modern pentathletes
Olympic modern pentathletes of Hungary
Modern pentathletes at the 2008 Summer Olympics
World Modern Pentathlon Championships medalists
Sportspeople from Székesfehérvár
20th-century Hungarian people
21st-century Hungarian people